Ulco is a town in Frances Baard District Municipality in the Northern Cape province of South Africa. It lies 10 kilometers from the Vaal River.

Established

The town was established around the mining activities Union Lime Company in 1949. The town is some 15 km northwest of Delportshoop and 60 km west-southwest of Warrenton.

Naming

The name is derived from Union Lime Company.

Nature of town

It is  a self-sustaining and private cement and mining town, which was established to  offer housing to its employees.   Electricity was also supplied to the area in 1949 for the first time.

Activities
It is  a site of extensive lime works. In 2009 it still had reserves for 150 years.

Schools

Two school exist namely Ulco Intermediate  School  and Ulco Primary School.

Weather

Highest temperature  ever measured is 44 °C and coldest  -9 °C . It has a desert like climate

References

Populated places in the Dikgatlong Local Municipality
Mining communities in South Africa
Populated places established in 1949